Mark Sanders may refer to:

 Mark Sanders (cricketer) (born 1979), South African cricketer
 Mark Sanders (designer), British designer and engineer
 Mark D. Sanders (born 1950), American musician

See also 
 Mark Saunders (disambiguation)